Robert Jarry (29 December 1924 – 17 September 2008) was a French politician.

He was a member of the French Communist Party. He served as Mayor of Le Mans from 1977 to 2001. He will have developed and modernized Le Mans in 24 years. He also encouraged the creation of social housing, retirement homes, sports halls.

Biography
Robert Jarry was born in Connerré, France on 1924 and died in Le Mans, France on 2008 at the age of 83. He was first of all the first secretary of the pcf federation of Sarthe from 1949 to 1977.

References 

1924 births
2008 deaths
French Communist Party politicians
20th-century French politicians
21st-century French politicians
Mayors of places in Pays de la Loire
People from Le Mans